Lushab-e Fariman (also Romanized as Lūshāb-e Farīmān; also known as Lūshāb, Lūshāb-e Qalandarābād, and Lushal) is a village in Fariman Rural District, in the Central District of Fariman County, Razavi Khorasan Province, Iran. At the 2006 census, its population was 937, in 207 families.

References 

Populated places in Fariman County